Serine/threonine-protein kinase receptor R3 is an enzyme that in humans is encoded by the ACVRL1 gene.

ACVRL1 is a receptor in the TGF beta signaling pathway.  It is also known as activin receptor-like kinase 1, or ALK1.

Function 

This gene encodes a type I cell-surface receptor for the TGF-beta superfamily of ligands. It shares with other type I receptors a high degree of similarity in serine-threonine kinase subdomains, a glycine- and serine-rich region (called the GS domain) preceding the kinase domain, and a short C-terminal tail. The encoded protein, sometimes termed ALK1, shares similar domain structures with other closely related ALK or activin receptor-like kinase proteins that form a subfamily of receptor serine/threonine kinases. Mutations in this gene are associated with hereditary hemorrhagic telangiectasia (HHT) type 2, also known as Rendu-Osler-Weber syndrome 2.

Pathology
Germline mutations of ACVRL1 are associated with:
 hereditary hemorrhagic telangiectasia type 2 (Rendu-Osler-Weber syndrome 2)
 Pulmonary arteriovenous malformations

Somatic mosaicism in ACVRL1 are associated with severe pulmonary arterial hypertension.

ACVRL1 directly interacts with low-density lipoprotein (LDL), which implies that it might initiate the early phases of atherosclerosis.

Abnormal activity of ACVRL1 has been found to be closely associated with idiopathic pulmonary arterial hypertension.

As a drug target
 Dalantercept is an experimental ALK1 inhibitor.

Closely/family related kinases
(Not to be confused with anaplastic lymphoma kinase (ALK)  )
ALK4 is ACVR1B, ALK7 is ACVR1C, and ALK5 is [part of] the TGF-β type I receptor.

See also 
 TGF beta signaling pathway, see summary table for ALK*

References

Further reading

External links 
  GeneReviews/NCBI/NIH/UW entry on Hereditary Hemorrhagic Telangiectasia
 

Human proteins
EC 2.7.11